Valian or  may refer to:
Mohammad Amin Valian (born 1989), Iranian activist
Dahan-e Valian, a village in Baghlan Province, Afghanistan
Do Ab-e Valian, a village in Baghlan Province, Afghanistan
Valian, Alborz, a village in Alborz Province, Iran
Valian, Lorestan, a village in Lorestan Province, Iran